Franz Heilmeier (born 20 October 1930) was a German sailor who competed in the 1972 Summer Olympics.

References

External links
 

1930 births
Possibly living people
German male sailors (sport)
Olympic sailors of West Germany
Sailors at the 1972 Summer Olympics – Dragon